The 2005 Subway 500 was the 32nd stock car racing race of the 2005 NASCAR Nextel Cup Series season, the sixth race of the 2005 Chase for the Nextel Cup, and the 57th iteration of the event. The race was held on Sunday, October 23, before a crowd of 72,000 in Martinsville, Virginia at Martinsville Speedway, a 0.526 miles (0.847 km) permanent oval-shaped short track. The race took the scheduled 500 laps to complete. At race's end, Jeff Gordon of Hendrick Motorsports would hold off the field on the final restart with three to go to take his 73rd career NASCAR Nextel Cup Series win and his fourth and final win of the season, completing a Martinsville sweep. To fill out the podium, Tony Stewart of Joe Gibbs Racing and Jimmie Johnson of Hendrick Motorsports would finish second and third, respectively.

Background 

Martinsville Speedway is an NASCAR-owned stock car racing track located in Henry County, in Ridgeway, Virginia, just to the south of Martinsville. At 0.526 miles (0.847 km) in length, it is the shortest track in the NASCAR Cup Series. The track was also one of the first paved oval tracks in NASCAR, being built in 1947 by H. Clay Earles. It is also the only remaining race track that has been on the NASCAR circuit from its beginning in 1948.

Practice

First practice 
The first practice session would occur on Friday, October 21, at 11:20 AM EST and would last for two hours.

Second practice 
The second practice session would occur on Saturday, October 22, at 9:30 AM EST and would last for 45 minutes.

Third and final practice 
The third and final practice session, sometimes referred as Happy Hour, would occur on Saturday, October 22, at 11:10 AM EST and would last for 45 minutes.

Qualifying 
Qualifying would take place on Friday, October 21, at 3:10 PM EST. Each driver would have two laps to set a fastest time; the fastest of the two would count as their official qualifying lap.

Full qualifying results

Race results

References 

2005 NASCAR Nextel Cup Series
NASCAR races at Martinsville Speedway
October 2005 sports events in the United States
2005 in sports in Virginia